The former First Church of Christ, Scientist is an historic Christian Science church edifice located at 1160 Georgia Street in the west end of Vancouver, British Columbia, Canada. It was designed in the Colonial Revival style by the noted Vancouver architectural firm of Matheson and De Guerre. Built in 1918, it is a  two-storey brick building with basement. In 2002, First Church of Christ, Scientist sold its building to Coastal Church. On  December 20, 2003, The city of Vancouver designated the building a local Heritage site.

References

Former Christian Science churches, societies and buildings in Canada
Churches in Vancouver
Heritage sites in British Columbia
Heritage buildings in Vancouver
Colonial Revival architecture